Ross Davis may refer to:

 Ross Davis (athlete), American Paralympic athlete
 Ross Davis (baseball) (1918–2013), African-American baseball pitcher in the Negro leagues
 Ross Davis (racing driver) (born 1950), former American racing driver
 Ross Davis (bowls) (born 1994), Jersey lawn bowls international

See also
 Ross Davies, rugby player
 Ross Davies (bishop) (born 1955), Australian former bishop of the Anglican Church of Australia